Rocca Sinibalda is a comune (municipality) in the Province of Rieti in the Italian region Lazio, located about  northeast of Rome and about  southeast of Rieti.

It is home to the Sforza Cesarini Castle, originally built in 1084 but turned into a more modern fortress in the 1530s by Baldassare Peruzzi, commissioned  by Cardinal Alessandro Cesarini. The interior has frescoes from the 17th and 18th centuries.

The remains of the ancient Sabine town of Trebula Mutusca are not far.

References

Cities and towns in Lazio